is an interchange railway station in the city of Yurihonjō, Akita Prefecture, Japan, jointly operated by East Japan Railway Company (JR East) and the third-sector Yuri Kōgen Railway Ltd.  It is also a freight terminal for the Japan Freight Railway Company (JR Freight).

Lines
It is also the terminal station for the Yuri Kōgen Railway Chōkai Sanroku Line and is 23.0 kilometers from the opposing terminus of the line at Yashima Station.

Station layout
Ugo-Honjō Station has two island platforms serving four tracks, connected by a footbridge. The station has a Midori no Madoguchi staffed ticket office.

Platforms

History
Ugo-Honjō Station opened on 30 June 1922. The Yashima Line was privatized on 1 October 1985, becoming the Yuri Kōgen Railway Chōkai Sanroku Line. With the privatization of JNR on 1 April 1987, the station came under the control of the East Japan Railway Company.

Passenger statistics
In fiscal 2018, the JR East portion of the station was used by an average of 1088 passengers daily (boarding passengers only), and the Yuri Kōgen Railway portion by 293 passengers.

Surrounding area
 Honjō city center

See also
List of railway stations in Japan

References

External links

 JR East Station information 

Railway stations in Japan opened in 1922
Railway stations in Akita Prefecture
Uetsu Main Line
Stations of Japan Freight Railway Company